Upper Pepper Island is an island on the Mohawk River south of Fort Johnson in Montgomery County, New York.

See also
 Pepper Island

References

Islands of New York (state)
Mohawk River
River islands of New York (state)